Central Institute of Medicinal and Aromatic Plants, popularly known as CIMAP, is a frontier plant research laboratory of Council of Scientific and Industrial Research (CSIR). Established originally as Central Indian Medicinal Plants Organisation (CIMPO) in 1959, CIMAP is steering multidisciplinary high quality research in biological and chemical sciences and extending technologies and services to the farmers and entrepreneurs of medicinal and aromatic plants (MAPs) with its research headquarter at Lucknow and Research Centres at Bangalore, Hyderabad, Pantnagar and Purara. CIMAP Research Centres are aptly situated in different agro-climatic zones of the country to facilitate multi-location field trials and research. A little more than 50 years since its inception, today, CIMAP has extended its wings overseas with scientific collaboration agreements with Malaysia. CSIR-CIMAP has signed two agreements to promote bilateral cooperation between India and Malaysia in research, development and commercialization of MAP related technologies. CIMAP’s contribution to the Indian economy through its MAPs research is well known. Mint varieties released and agro-packages developed and popularised by CIMAP has made India the global leader in mints and related industrial products. CIMAP has released several varieties of the MAPs, their complete agro-technology and post harvest packages which have revolutionised MAPs cultivation and business scenario of the country. Recognizing the urgent need for stimulating research on medicinal plants in the country and for coordinating and consolidating some work already done by organizations like the Indian council of Agricultural Research, Indian Council of Medical Research, Tropical School of Medicine of Culcutta and various States Governments and Individual workers, the Council Scientific and Industrial Research approved in 1957 the establishment of the Central Indian Medicinal Plants Organization (CIMPO) with the following objectives. ‘To co-ordinate and channelise along fruitful directions the present activities in the field of medicinal plants carried out by the various agencies, State Governments etc., to develop the already existing medicinal plants resources of India, to bring under cultivation some of the important medicinal plants in great demand and also to introduce the cultivation into the country of exotic medicinal plants of high yielding active principal content’ It was further decide that as the work on all aspects of cultivation of aromatics plants was identical with all the cultivation of medicinal plants, the aromatic plants should also be covered within the scope of CIMPO. The Essential Oils Research Committee functioning under the Council of Scientific & Industrial Research was then dissolve and its activities taken over by CIMPO. The Organization started functioning with effect from 26 March 1959 with the appointment of late Shri P.M. Nabar its first Officer Incharge.

The branch in Hyderabad was established on 7 July 1982.

References

External links
 CIMAP Official website
Official CIMAP Hyderabad website

Council of Scientific and Industrial Research
Agricultural research institutes in India
Research institutes in Lucknow
Botanical research institutes
Medical research institutes in India
Medicinal plants of Asia
Traditional medicine in India
Organisations based in Uttar Pradesh
Research institutes established in 1959
1959 establishments in Uttar Pradesh
Research institutes in Hyderabad, India
Research institutes established in 1982
1982 establishments in Andhra Pradesh